Case v. Minot, 158 Mass. 577 (1893), was a case decided by the Supreme Court of Massachusetts that was one of the first cases to hold that inaction by a landlord could establish a constructive eviction.

Decision
The court held that the landlord was responsible for the constructive eviction of a tenant when the landlord allowed another lessee to obstruct the tenant's light and air.  Traditionally, constructive eviction was only found when the landlord had acted intentionally to interfere with the tenant's possession of their lease.

References

Landlord–tenant law
1893 in United States case law
Massachusetts state case law
1893 in Massachusetts
Real property law in the United States
Law articles needing an infobox